Dongam Station is a station on Seoul Metropolitan Subway Line 1 and Gyeongin Line.

References

Railway stations opened in 1974
Seoul Metropolitan Subway stations
Metro stations in Incheon
Bupyeong District